Bohostice is a municipality and village in Příbram District in the Central Bohemian Region of the Czech Republic. It has about 200 inhabitants.

Administrative parts

The village of Kamenná is an administrative part of Bohostice.

Geography
It lies in the Benešov Uplands. It is situated on the shore of the Orlík Reservoir.

The Bohostický Stream flows through the municipality. Along the stream there is the Bohostice Nature Monument, protected due to the occurrence of the dusky large blue. It was declared in 2013.

History
The first written mention of Bohostice is from 1386.

Sights
On the Chlumec hill there is a Jewish cemetery. It is a well-preserved small village cemetery with valuable, mostly Neoclassical gravestones and several remarkable younger stelae of the traditional type from the mid-19th century.

The Bohostice Castle was built in the mid-18th century and was rebuilt in the 19th century. Due to insensitive modifications in the 1980s, the monument protection of the building was cancelled.

The remains of the Church of St. Stephen from 1352 in the former village of Těchnice still stands below the reservoir surface. It was flooded during the construction of the dam in 1960.

References

External links

Villages in Příbram District